Florence Storgoff, was born in Canora, Saskatchewan in 1908 and died September 11, 1964, in British Columbia. She moved to British Columbia, married and joined the militant  Freedomites group, who were sensationalized in the press as "Sons of Freedom." In that movement she and her husband strongly protested against the government and both were arrested. She served three years in the Kingston Penitentiary for women for arson. She gained attention in 1963 when she led the "Trek" involving hundreds of Freedomites camping out at Agassiz Mountain Prison to protest the arrest of fellow members.

External links
Brief bios of Canadian women religious figures

1908 births
1964 deaths
Canadian activists

Canadian arsonists
People from Canora, Saskatchewan
Canadian women activists